Yongfeng County is a county of central Jiangxi province, People's Republic of China. It is under the jurisdiction of the prefecture-level city of Ji'an.

Administration
As of 2016, Yongfeng County was made up of 8 towns, 13 townships, and 3 other areas.
 
8 Towns

12 Townships

1 Ethnic Township
 She Longgang

Demographics 

Climate

Notes and references 

County-level divisions of Jiangxi